Mustafa Baruti was a 19th-century Albanian politician. He was one of the delegates of the Albanian Declaration of Independence.

References

19th-century Albanian people
People from Struga
Year of death missing
Year of birth missing
All-Albanian Congress delegates
People from Manastir vilayet